Rozlyn Khan is a Mumbai-based actress and PETA model known for her breast cancer awareness activities.

Career
Khan has appeared in television advertisements, most notably for Fruity drink, Monaco biscuits and Kelvinator.

Khan appears in the film Dhama Choukdhi. with Sanjay Mishra, Mukesh Tiwari and Dipraj Rana. Streaming on Jio cinema and Eros now.

Her television show debut was on crime show Crime Alert on Dangal TV in 2018.

Filmography

Film

Television

References

External links

 Official website

Living people
Year of birth missing (living people)